Protogynanisa is a genus of moths in the family Saturniidae first described by Rougeot in 1971.

Species
Protogynanisa athletoides Rougeot, 1971
Protogynanisa probsti Bouyer, 2001

References

Saturniinae